"Dance Floor Anthem (I Don't Wanna Be in Love)", known as "Dance Floor Anthem" on the album, is a song by American pop punk band Good Charlotte on their fourth studio album, Good Morning Revival (2007). The song became the band's best-selling single in Australia, reaching number two for three nonconsecutive weeks and earning a platinum certification. In the US, the song peaked at number 25 on the Billboard Hot 100 and was also certified platinum. Elsewhere, the single reached number 11 in New Zealand, number 18 in Slovakia, number 19 in Finland, and number 35 in Canada.

Music video
The video (directed by Sean Michael Turrell) begins in a shot of a beating heart on a TV monitor, and the shot becomes a small montage of the band in a party, and also in a white and orange corridor playing their instruments. This scene alternates with shots of Joel Madden and a woman in an elevator. When the chorus comes, the band appears in individual shots in the party. This turns into the band in the corridor again, and then into Madden's elevator buddy raging at him. The party scene, the corridor scene, a new scene of three nurses dancing in a vacant corridor, a new elevator scene and the TV heart breaking apart play throughout the chorus, and then the video turns into individual shots of the band playing in the elevator. These scenes alternate until the end.

Chart performance
The single became the band's most successful song in Australia, debuting at number two on the ARIA Singles Chart on July 15, 2007, behind Rihanna's hit "Umbrella". It dropped to number three the next week, then spent two weeks at number four before returning to number two, this time behind Australia's best-selling single of the year—"Big Girls Don't Cry" by Fergie. The song dropped to number three for two weeks, then rose to number two one last time on September 9, still behind "Big Girls Don't Cry". Afterwards, the song steadily dropped down the chart, spending a further 21 weeks in the top 50. At the end of the year, the single came in 12th for the best-selling single of the year. In neighboring New Zealand, the song debuted at number 38 on August 13, then reached its peak position of number 11 six weeks later, becoming the band's second-highest charting single there after "I Just Wanna Live", which reached number six. It spent 26 weeks on the Recorded Music NZ (then RIANZ) chart altogether.

"Dance Floor Anthem" is the second highest-peaking song of Good Charlotte's career on the US Billboard Hot 100 to date, where it reached number 25. In Canada, the song reached number 35 on the Canadian Hot 100 chart. In Europe, it managed to chart in Finland, where it debuted and peaked at number 19 on the seventh chart week of 2008, but it dropped out of the chart the next week. It also appeared on Slovakia's chart, where it reached number 18 and spent 41 nonconsecutive weeks in the top 100.

Track listings

US CD ringle
 "I Don't Wanna Be in Love (Dance Floor Anthem)" – 4:04
 "Keep Your Hands Off My Girl" (Brass Knuckles remix) – 3:26
 "The River" (acoustic version) – 3:32
 "I Don't Wanna Be in Love (Dance Floor Anthem)" (ringtone)

Australian CD single
 "Dance Floor Anthem (I Don't Want to Be in Love)" (radio edit)
 "Dance Floor Anthem (I Don't Want to Be in Love)" (album version)
 "Keep Your Hands Off My Girl" (Brass Knuckles remix)

Charts

Weekly charts

Year-end charts

Certifications

References

2007 songs
2007 singles
Dance-rock songs
Daylight Records singles
Epic Records singles
Good Charlotte songs
Songs written by Benji Madden
Songs written by Joel Madden
Sony BMG singles